Alok Dixit is a journalist turned social activist, fighting for freedom of Internet in India. He is the founder member of Save Your Voice, a movement against Internet censorship in India and Stop Acid Attacks, a campaign against acid violence.

Dixit is creating a nationwide awareness among young people through his writings and peaceful protests for a free and open Internet. He is advocating for the protection of freedom of expression and human rights by engaging communities and supporting voices worldwide.

He is also working with government, donors, media, NGOs, celebrities and students to help acid survivors rebuild their lives and to prevent further attack.

Early life
Dixit was born in Kanpur in 1988. He is an alumnus of Indian Institute of Journalism & New Media, Bangalore, India.

Career
Dixit joined Indian Air Force in 2007 and served till Mar 2009. He resigned from the service and became a fellow of Indian Institute of Journalism & New Media, Bangalore. After a short service as a reporter in TV9 News channel in Mumbai, he switched to Jagran Prakashan Limited and worked for portal Inext Live.

Dixit works with the survivors of acid attacks in India. In the last two years, Dixit built a campaign across the country called "Stop Acid Attacks". This organization, made up mainly of acid attack victims, makes it a point to visit the victims and help them in whatever way possible.

Personal life

Dixit, set out to fight against the scourge of acid attacks in India. Along the way, he found himself in a relationship with acid attack survivor turned activist and TV Anchor, Laxmi Agarwal. A winner of the 2014 International Women of Courage Award, Laxmi underwent seven major surgeries to try and reduce the burns to her skin. In an interview with People Magazine, Agarwal said ‘'After the attack, I never thought I would ever find a soulmate. I had lost hope. She said: 'Someone asked me the question of what if the attacker still offered to marry me? I said, he has changed my face, but he has failed to change my mind". Afterward,I never wanted to find love. I mean there was no hope in any case because of the scars".

Dixit says, "Just like anyone falls in love, I fell in love with Laxmi".
"Yes, she is the victim of an acid attack, and it shows, but that did not come in the way of our relationship. I liked her courage and the fact that she boldly faced the world without trying to hide within four walls".

Both decided not to get married and instead be in a live-in relationship. Dixit writes in one of his blogs on Aljazeera, "Marriage in our situation can bring with it lots of pressure on us. Relatives will attend the wedding for the curiosity value rather than any real concern for our happiness". He says, "I am not going to follow the norms that the society approves of. We will prove that our love does not need a name. Our love is about understanding and support".

'I decided to live together until we die. But we are challenging the society by not getting married. We don’t want people to come to our wedding and comment on Laxmi's looks. The looks of a bride are most important for people. So I decided not to have any ceremony' says Dixit.

Their families have accepted the relationship and also their decision not to have a ceremonial wedlock. However, they separated from each other due to differences in 2015. They now have a daughter named Pihu.

Internet Censorship
Dixit along with his friend Aseem Trivedi and Arpit Gupta and Chirag Joshi started Save Your Voice, which soon became a public movement in India. His campaigning against the government and intermediaries has gained international media attention. A debate on the issue of internet censorship has been started after the creative protests of Save Your Voice. Langada March was a big success of his campaigns in the initial days. Sibal’s Day Campaign and Freedom in the Cage involved young bloggers, writers, journalists and students to its campaign.

While reporting on the Sibal’s Day campaign, a reporter writes in The Wall Street Journal, " Although Save Your Voice is relatively small; it is gaining popularity on social media." The Hindu observes Freedom in the cage as the idea which portrays that artistes inside a cage playing the guitar or painting a canvas was equal to the government's IT rules that have "caged" the freedom of the people granted by the Constitution of India.

Freedom Fast
With his reservations on the Intermediary Guidelines of the Information Technology Act, 2011 of India, Dixit along with his colleague Trivedi started a hunger strike at Jantar Mantar to support the annulment motion in Rajya Sabha. Foreign Policy considers this fast as the 'most colorful highlights' from the internet freedom movements in India.

The former CNN journalist and co-founder of Global Voices Online, Rebecca MacKinnon writes, "A lively national Internet freedom movement has grown rapidly across India since the beginning of this year. The most colorful highlight so far was a seven-day Gandhian hunger strike, otherwise known as a "freedom fast," held in early May on a New Delhi sidewalk by political cartoonist Aseem Trivedi and activist-journalist Alok Dixit." The Hindu quotes Dixit on the fourth day of the Hunger strike, "The empowerment that social media provides has begun to be seen as threatening. This is an attempt to clamp down on an individual’s right to dissent and his freedom of expression. Dixit and his friend ended their Anshan after their health deteriorated and Police forcefully admitted them to the Ram Manohar Lohia Hospital in New Delhi." Reporters Without Borders criticized Indian Government in their press release saying, "Two of the movement’s campaigners, the cartoonist Aseem Trivedi and the citizen journalist Dixit Dixit, were forced today to end a hunger strike they began on 2 May. Their health had deteriorated considerably and they were hospitalized".

Occupy India
Masked members of Save Your Voice held a protest at Jantar Mantar in New Delhi against Indian government's attempts to restrict freedom on the Internet. The protest in India was spearheaded by 'Save Your Voice' and 'Anonymous' at various historic monuments in 16 cities, of India. Dixit took active part in the networking between the International hacking group and Indian members of Save Your Voice.

The protest has resulted in access being denied to a host of websites that carry illegal copies of films and albums among other legal content, including isohunt.com and pastebin.com. The website of one of the Save Your Voice members, Trivedi, was also blocked by BigRock and against which the members protested and campaigned throughout India. "The government is bringing censorship through the back door and we will oppose it," says Dixit in one of his interviews with The Asian Age. To register their protest, campaigners have also hacked the website of state-run telecom provider MTNL and pasted the logo of the Anonymous group, the mask of 17th century British revolutionary Guy Fawkes, on mtnl.net.in. MTNL's corporate website could not be accessed for over four hours, following the attack, but its individual city-specific websites (for Delhi and Mumbai)remained unaffected.

Arrest of cartoonist Aseem Trivedi
Police in Maharashtra state arrested Aseem Trivedi, a political cartoonist and the co-founder of Save Your Voice campaign, on Saturday, 9 September 2012. He faced charges of sedition, violating Internet security laws, and insulting national honor for publishing cartoons mocking national symbols and criticizing corruption on his website, Cartoons Against Corruption. After the Trivedi’s arrest, Dixit run a nationwide campaign against the arrest of the cartoonist under the banner of Save Your Voice. The campaign got huge public support from civil society groups and artist communities across borders. Mahesh Bhatt, a prominent Bollywood figure and film director, joined the press conference at Mumbai Press Club with activist Dixit and offered every possible support in Trivedi’s case. Dixit has also mediated between the Home Minister RR Patil and cartoonist Trivedi when cartoonist refused to take bail. Dixit is now working closely with the prominent activists like Binayak Sen, Arvind Kejriwal, Arundhati Roy and Trivedi to repeal the Sedition Law.

Hunger Strike against Sec 66 A of the IT Act
After repeated misuse of sec 66 A of the IT Act Dixit with his colleague from Save Your Voice, Trivedi decided to sit on an indefinite hunger (Anshan) strike against this draconian law. This got a bigger public attention when activist turned politician Arvind Kejriwal joined this campaign and promised to make it a nationwide agenda. He and his colleague Trivedi ended the fast after Kejriwal requested him not to waste his life and rather work towards 'uprooting the UPA government'. To support the hunger strike, Anonymous hacked the Bharat Sanchar Nigam Limited (BSNL) website.  BSNL home page showed an image of cartoonist Trivedi with text that read "Hacked by Anonymous India. Support Aseem trivedi (cartoonist) and Dixit on the hunger strike. Remove IT Act 66 A databases of all 250 bsnl site has been d Hacked by Anonymous India (sic)".

See also

The Information Technology Act, 2000
Internet censorship in India

References

1988 births
Living people
Journalists from Uttar Pradesh
Right to Information activists
Internet censorship